Kakhk Rural District is a rural district (dehestan) in Kakhk District, Gonabad County, Razavi Khorasan Province, Iran. At the 2006 census, its population was 3,052, in 1,118 families.  The rural district has 55 villages.

References 

Rural Districts of Razavi Khorasan Province
Gonabad County